Georges Chaperot (born 21 April 1902, date of death unknown) was a French screenwriter who co-wrote the story of the film A Cage of Nightingales (1945) with René Wheeler, for which they both received an Academy Award nomination in 1947. Their story would later serve as an inspiration for the hugely successful film The Chorus (2004).

Selected filmography
 Moutonnet (1936)
 The Murdered Model (1948)

References

External links

Georges Chaperot's profile at the Swedish Film Database

French male screenwriters
French screenwriters
1902 births
Year of death missing